The ARIA Music Award for Best Classical Album, is an award presented within the Fine Arts Awards at the annual ARIA Music Awards.  The ARIA Awards recognise "the many achievements of Aussie artists across all music genres", and have been given by the Australian Recording Industry Association (ARIA) since 1987.

Classical albums by Australian solo artists and groups are eligible, as well as Australian featured artists or soloists involved with non-Australian ensembles or orchestras (providing the album packaging credits the Australian/s as the featured artist/s).  It is judged by a specialist judging school of between 40 and 100 representatives experienced with classical music.

The Australian Brandenburg Orchestra has received the award five times.  The Australian Chamber Orchestra has been a three-time winner, with the ACO's Richard Tognetti receiving a further two awards for his solo violin recordings.

Winners and nominees
In the following table, the winner is highlighted in a separate colour, and in boldface; the nominees are those that are not highlighted or in boldface. Nominees from 1988 are not available in published sources.

References

External links
The ARIA Awards Official website

C
Classical music awards